Lough Currane, also called Lough Leeagh, is a lake in County Kerry, Ireland. Waterville lies on its western bank, close to the Atlantic Ocean, it empties into Ballinskelligs Bay. Raheen lies on its southern bank.
The lake is notable for the Early Medieval monastery on Church Island. It is associated with had the St. Finan Cam, who inhabited the island c. 7th century. To the south of the lake is Inis Uasal (Noble Island), an island dedicated to St. Finan. The Annals of Inisfallen mention that Amchad, the "anchorite of God" was buried on the island in 1058.

Angling
The lough is famous for its salmon and Sea trout fly fishing, having a good run of both spring salmon and grilse in addition to regularly producing specimen sea trout with some running to over 10 lb. (4.5 kg) From June the lake contains a prolific number of smaller sea trout, know locally as 'Juners', analogous to the Scottish Finnock.

References

External links
Official site

Lakes of County Kerry